Zone B of the 1995 Davis Cup Europe/Africa Group III was one of two zones in the Europe/Africa Group III of the 1995 Davis Cup. 10 teams competed across two pools in a round robin competition, with the top team in each pool advancing to Group II in 1996.

Participating nations

Draw
 Venue: Tennis Club de Brazzaville, Brazzaville, Congo
 Date: 26–30 April

Group A

Group B

  and  promoted to Group II in 1996.

Group A

Congo vs. Cyprus

Ethiopia vs. Kenya

Cyprus vs. Ethiopia

Kenya vs. Malta

Congo vs. Malta

Cyprus vs. Kenya

Congo vs. Kenya

Ethiopia vs. Malta

Congo vs. Ethiopia

Cyprus vs. Malta

Group B

Algeria vs. Sudan

Senegal vs. Turkey

Algeria vs. Zambia

Sudan vs. Turkey

Algeria vs. Turkey

Senegal vs. Zambia

Algeria vs. Senegal

Sudan vs. Zambia

Senegal vs. Sudan

Turkey vs. Zambia

References

External links
Davis Cup official website

Davis Cup Europe/Africa Zone
Europe Africa Zone Group III